The Berner Platte (English: Bernese plate) is a traditional meat dish of Bernese cuisine in Switzerland. It consists of various meat and sausage varieties such as smoked pork and beef, pork belly, sausage, bacon and pork ears or tails cooked with juniper-flavored sauerkraut, and other foods such as potatoes and green and/or dried beans, which are served on a large plate.

The Berner Platte is not a stew; rather, the different meat ingredients and side dishes are each separately prepared or cooked. Berner Platte dishes are sometimes served within the context of a buffet.

History
For this purpose, the community contributed the best of their supplies. Due to the late winters, mainly durable or preserved foods were used, which were combined to create the well-known dish.

See also

 Choucroute garnie – a similar French dish
 Schlachteplatte – a similar German dish
 List of meat dishes
 Swiss cuisine

References

External links
 
 Berner Platte: a gourmet celebration. Myswitzerland.com.

Swiss cuisine
Meat dishes
Food combinations